William John Loftie (25 July 1839, Tandragee, County Armagh, Ireland – 16 June 1911) was a British clergyman and writer, on the history of London, travel, art and architecture.

Biography
He was educated at Trinity College, Dublin. After holding church appointments, he joined the staff of the Saturday Review, and in 1894 that of the National Observer. As a writer on antiquarian subjects he combined learning and picturesque statement.

Works
Published works:
The Latin Year (1873)
Views in the English Lake District (1875)
English Lake Scenery (1875) with T. L. Rowbotham
Picturesque Scottish Scenery from the Original Drawings of T. L. Rowbotham (1875)
A Plea for Art in the House (1876)
Views in North Wales from Original Drawings By T. L. Rowbotham (1875)
In and Out of London: or, The Half-Holidays of a Town Clerk (1875)
Views in Wicklow & Killarney (1876)
Catalogue of the Prints and Etchings of Hans Sebald Beham (1877)
A Ride In Egypt From Sioot To Luxor In 1879 (1879)
Round About London, Historical, Archaeological, Architectural, and Picturesque Notes (1880)
Queen Anne's Son: the Memoirs of William Henry, Duke of Gloucester, Reprinted from a Tract Published in 1789 (1881) editor
A History of London (1883)
A History of London. Supplement to the First Edition (1884)
An Essay on Scarabs (1884)
Lessons in the Art of Illuminating (1885)
Windsor: a Description of the Castle, Park, Town and Neighbourhood (1886)
Marchfield: a Story of Commercial Morality (London: SPCK c.1886)
Historic Towns London (1887)
Kensington Picturesque & Historical (1888)
Authorised Guide to the Tower of London, 2nd edition (1888); 1st edition 1886
Orient Line Guide: Chapters for Travellers by Sea and Land (1890)
Ye Oldest Diarie of Englysshe Travell: Being the hitherto unpublished narrative of the pilgrimage of Sir Richard Torkington to Jerusalem in 1517 (c.1890) editor
London City: Its History, Streets, Traffic, Buildings, People (1891)
Westminster Abbey (1891)
The Cathedral Churches of England and Wales (1892)
Inigo Jones and Wren: or, The Rise and Decline of Modern Architecture in England (1893)
Inns of Court & Chancery (1893)
Whitehall Historical and Architectural (1895)
Reynolds and Children’s Portraiture in England
Sir Edwin Landseer and Animal Painting in England (1897)
Kensington Palace (1898)
London Afternoons (1901) essays, as Rambles in and near London (1903)
The Coronation Book of Edward VII, King of All the Britons and Emperor of India (1902)
The Colour of London, historic, personal, & local (1907) illustrated by Yoshio Markino
Victoria's London (1984) volume 1 reprint of London City

Notes

References

External links 
 
 
 
 

1839 births
1911 deaths
People from Tandragee
19th-century Irish Anglican priests
British non-fiction writers
Alumni of Trinity College Dublin
British male writers
Male non-fiction writers